Masters W65 javelin world record progression is the progression of world record improvements of the javelin throw W65 division of Masters athletics.  Records must be set in properly conducted, official competitions under the standing IAAF rules unless modified by World Masters Athletics.

The W65 division consists of female athletes who have reached the age of 65 but have not yet reached the age of 70, so exactly from their 65th birthday to the day before their 70th birthday. Since 2014, the W65 division throws a 500 g implement.

Key

References

Masters Athletics Javelin list

Masters athletics world record progressions
Javelin